The Originals pack was a re-release of the first three albums by the rock band Kiss: Kiss, Hotter Than Hell and Dressed to Kill. The paper sleeves holding each disc were duplicates of the original album covers. It was packaged with a 16-page history booklet, a color Kiss Army sticker, and a sheet of six trading cards.

Reception
The set was released to stimulate sales of the earlier albums once Destroyer became the first Kiss studio album to go gold. It reached a peak of #36 on the US charts in September 1976.

Track listing

Record I - Kiss

Record II - Hotter Than Hell

Record III - Dressed to Kill

References 

Kiss (band) compilation albums
1976 compilation albums
Casablanca Records compilation albums

pt:The Originals (álbum)